HD 156331 is double star in the southern constellation of Ara. As of 2014, the pair have an angular separation of less than an arc second along a position angle of 49°.

References

External links
 HR 6423
 HIP 84759
 Image HD 156331

Ara (constellation)
156331
Double stars
084759
F-type giants
B-type main-sequence stars
6423
Durchmusterung objects